The 1874–75 season was Northwich Victoria's 1st season playing solely Association Football. Before this year, club played both Rugby and Association Football as well as hare and hounds. The club's first game was against Stedman College on a field in the nearby village of Comberbach.

First-team squad
This is the squad who played for Northwich Victoria in their first ever game.

Notes
A. : Also the club's honourable secretary and treasurer.
B. : Also the club's joint honourable secretary.

References

See also
List of Northwich Victoria F.C. seasons

Northwich Victoria F.C. seasons
Northwich Victoria